The North Star 500 is a Canadian trailerable sailboat that was designed by the American firm of Sparkman & Stephens as an International Offshore Rule Quarter Ton class racer and first built in 1973. The boat was Sparkman & Stephens' design #2135.

The North Star 500 was also built in Finland as the Blue Bird 25.

Production
The design was built by North Star Yachts in Canada starting in 1973, but it is now out of production.

Design
The North Star 500 is a racing keelboat, built predominantly of fibreglass. It has a masthead sloop rig, a raked stem, a slightly reverse transom, a skeg-mounted rudder controlled by a tiller and a fixed fin keel. It displaces  and carries  of ballast.

The boat is fitted with a Universal Atomic 4  gasoline engine for docking and manoeuvring.

The design has sleeping accommodation for four people.

For sailing downwind the design may be equipped with a symmetrical spinnaker.

Operational history
The boat is supported by an active class club that organizes racing events, the Quarter Ton Class.

In a 2010 review Steve Henkel wrote, "in 1969, U.S. Steel, anxious to take part in the boom in leisure market goods, bought Hughes Boatworks Ltd. of Centralia, Ontario, Canada, and began selling boats under the North Star Yachts brand name. In 1971, the company contracted with Sparkman & Stephens to design the North Star 500 (25) with the notion of competing in Quarter Ton races. The new design promptly won the quarter ton World Championship. However, production of the boat was discontinued in 1973, perhaps partly because she was a comparatively well built but expensive toy with a single purpose, namely to win quarter ton races. The recession of 1973-1974 also may have been a factor in her demise. Best features: She's a fast quarter tonner. Worst features: The North Star has the least headroom in her comp group, and the deepest draft, both of which limits her utility as a cruising boat. For example, one of her competitors, the C&C 25 ... which came out in 1972, has less draft, more headroom, and a lot more space below, and according to her PHRF rating, may be a faster boat."

See also
List of sailing boat types

References

Keelboats
1970s sailboat type designs
Sailing yachts
Trailer sailers
Sailboat type designs by Sparkman and Stephens
Sailboat types built by North Star Yachts